Pain Bisheh Sar (also Romanized as Pā’īn Bīsheh Sar; also known as Bīsheh Sar Pā’īn) is a village in Feyziyeh Rural District, in the Central District of Babol County, Mazandaran Province, Iran. At the 2006 census, its population was 2,849, in 739 families.

References 

Populated places in Babol County